Dustin Ray Smith (born July 17, 1975) is an American Christian musician.  His first release with Integrity Music was in 2012, You Are the Fire. This album was his breakthrough release upon the Billboard magazine Heatseekers Albums chart. The subsequent release, Rushing Waters, was released in 2013, but this failed to chart. He release, Coming Alive, in 2014, and this charted on the aforementioned chart alongside a charting on the Christian Albums chart.

Early life
Smith was born Dustin Ray Smith on July 17, 1975, who is a preachers son.

Personal life
He is the worship leader at World Revival Church located in Kansas City, Missouri, where his services are watched from over 200 nations spanning the globe. Smith is married to Jeenna, and they have three children together, two sons and a daughter.

Music career
Smith's music career commenced with his album, You Are the Fire, was released on July 24, 2012 by integrity Music. This was his breakthrough release upon the Billboard magazine charts, where it placed on the Heatseekers Albums chart at No. 50. The third album, Rushing Waters, was released by Integrity Music on September 10, 2013, yet this album failed to place on any charts. His fourth album, Coming Alive, was released on September 23, 2014 from Integrity Music. This album placed on the aforementioned chart at No. 11 and Christian Albums at No. 19.

Discography

Studio albums

References

External links
 Official website
 Cross Rhythms artist profile
 365 Days of Inspiring Music Coming Alive review
 All about Worship Coming Alive review
 Christian Music Review Coming Alive review

1975 births
Living people
American performers of Christian music
Musicians from Kansas City, Missouri
Songwriters from Missouri